The 1932 All-Ireland Senior Football Championship Final was the 45th All-Ireland Final and the deciding match of the 1932 All-Ireland Senior Football Championship, an inter-county Gaelic football tournament for the top teams in Ireland.

Mayo led 1-4 to 1-1 at half-time but, as in 1931, Kerry were much stronger in the second half. Goals by Bill Landers and Paul Russell helped Kerry to their fourth All-Ireland in a row. Kerry's Éamonn Fitzgerald missed the final as he was competing in the 1932 Summer Olympics. 

It was the third of five All-Ireland football titles won by Kerry in the 1930s.

References

All-Ireland Senior Football Championship Final
All-Ireland Senior Football Championship Final, 1932
All-Ireland Senior Football Championship Finals
Kerry county football team matches
Mayo county football team matches